Fred Foster Griffin (born July 27, 1995) is an American professional baseball pitcher for the Yomiuri Giants of Nippon Professional Baseball (NPB). He previously played in Major League Baseball (MLB) with the Kansas City Royals and Toronto Blue Jays.

Career

Kansas City Royals
Griffin attended The First Academy in Orlando, Florida. The Kansas City Royals selected him in the first round of the 2014 Major League Baseball draft. He signed on June 10, and was assigned to the Burlington Royals, where he posted a 3.21 ERA in 28 innings pitched. Griffin spent 2015 with the Lexington Legends where he went 4–6 with a 5.44 ERA. In 2016, Griffin split time between Lexington and the Wilmington Blue Rocks, where he posted a combined 6–4 record and a 5.43 ERA between the two teams. He spent 2017 with both the Wilmington Blue Rocks and the Northwest Arkansas Naturals where he went a combined 15–7 with a 3.35 ERA between both clubs, and 2018 back with the Naturals where he pitched to a 10–12 record with a 5.13 ERA in 28 games (26 starts).  He spent 2019 with the Omaha Storm Chasers, going 8–6 with a 5.23 ERA over 25 starts, striking out 111 over  innings.

Griffin was added to the Royals 40-man roster following the 2019 season. Griffin made his major league debut on July 27, 2020, and pitched  scoreless innings to earn the win against the Detroit Tigers.

On August 11, 2020, Griffin underwent Tommy John surgery. On November 30, 2020, Griffin was designated for assignment. On December 2, 2020, the Royals nontendered Griffin, making him a free agent. On December 12, 2020, Griffin re-signed with the Royals on a minor league contract. He made 15 rehab appearances with numerous Royals minor league affiliates in 2021. He began the 2022 season with the Triple-A Omaha Storm Chasers.

On May 20, 2022, Griffin had his contract selected by the Royals. He was designated for assignment on July 11.

Toronto Blue Jays
On July 16, 2022, Griffin was acquired in a trade with the Kansas City Royals. He was released on November 15.

Yomiuri Giants
On January 12, 2023, Griffin signed with the Yomiuri Giants of Nippon Professional Baseball.

References

External links

1995 births
Living people
Baseball players from Orlando, Florida
Major League Baseball pitchers
Kansas City Royals players
Toronto Blue Jays players
Burlington Royals players
Lexington Legends players
Wilmington Blue Rocks players
Northwest Arkansas Naturals players
Omaha Storm Chasers players
Buffalo Bisons (minor league) players
Tigres del Licey players
American expatriate baseball players in the Dominican Republic